Andrew Thomas (born 2 December 1982) is an English former footballer who played as a defender.

Thomas signed for his hometown club, Stockport County, as a teenager and made 12 Football League appearances between 2001 and 2003 before being released. He subsequently played for Witton Albion and Kidsgrove Athletic before joining Leek Town in 2006.

Andrew is a UEFA B Qualified Coach and is currently First Team Coach at Bury AFC

References

1982 births
Living people
Footballers from Stockport
English footballers
Association football defenders
Stockport County F.C. players
Leek Town F.C. players